Léger or Leger (sometimes as Légère or Legere) is a surname, and may refer to:

 Alexis Leger (1887–1975), French poet and diplomat who used the pseudonym Saint-John Perse, awarded the Nobel Prize for Literature
 Allan Legere (born 1948), Canadian serial killer
 Antoine Joseph Léger (1880–1950), Canadian politician, lawyer and author
 Auguste Théophile Léger (1852–1923), Canadian politician
 Aurel Léger (1894–1961), Canadian politician
 Dick Leger (1925–1999), square dance caller
 Édouard H. Léger (1866–1892), Canadian politician and physician
 Émile Léger (1795–1838), French mathematician
 Fernand Léger (1881–1955), French painter, sculptor and filmmaker
 Jacqueline Legere (born 1991), Canadian athlete and stuntwoman
 Jacques Nicolas Léger (1859–1918), Haitian lawyer, politician and diplomat
 John Legere (born 1958), American CEO of T-Mobile
 Jules Léger (1913–1980), Canadian diplomat and Governor General of Canada (1974–1979)
 Louis Léger (1843–1923), French writer and pioneer in Slavic studies
 Marcel Léger (1930–1993), Canadian politician
 Mary Legere, American general
 Nicole Léger (born 1955), Canadian politician
 Omer Léger (born 1931), Canadian politician
 Paul-Émile Léger (1904–1991), Canadian Roman Catholic cardinal and Archbishop of Montreal
 Phoebe Legere, American musician
 Ricky Legere (born 1985), American mixed martial artist
 Roger Leger (1919–1965), Canadian National Hockey League player
 Sébastien Léger (born 1979), French DJ
 Teresa Leger Fernandez (born 1959), American politician
 Urbain-Louis-Eugène Léger (1866–1948), French zoologist
 Viola Léger (1930-2023), Acadian-Canadian actress and former Canadian senator
 Walt Leger III (born 1978), American politician in Louisiana
 Leger (chess player), an 18th-century chess player

See also 
 Leger (disambiguation)

French-language surnames